Hannah T. King (Tapfield; 16 March 1808 – 25 September 1886) was a 19th-century British-born American writer and pioneer. Converting to Mormonism while in England, her family emigrated to the American state of Utah in 1853 where she became endeared to the people of that state. She was the author of Songs of the Heart, several poems, as well as writings addressed to young readers. King was the last woman sealed to Brigham Young. She died in 1886.

Early life
Hannah Dorcas Tapfield was born 16 March 1808 in Sawston, Cambridgeshire, England. Her parents, Mary Lawson and Peter Tapfield, were devoted members of the Church of England, with her grandfather being a rector of that church. Her early days were passed in Cambridge.

Career

England
She married Thomas Owen King Sr., a farmer, on April 6, 1824; they had 10 children. In 1850, she converted to the Mormon faith, and in 1853, the family removed to the United States. Of her life and connections with Mormonism she said:—

She was a literary woman and one of the personal correspondents of the English poet Eliza Cook. Her connection with the Church of Jesus Christ of Latter-day Saints (LDS Church) brought her a respectability in the Cambridge Branch of the LDS Church.

Utah
King's poems suggest her love of exalted subjects and noble characters. She was enchanted with the part of Queen Isabella and the mission of Columbus. She wished that she could be an Isabella and find and fund a Columbus.

King created pieces for the Polysophical Society of Salt Lake, founded by Eliza and Lorenzo Snow, as well as other societies and the press. An admirer of the English poet Eliza Cook, King indulged her feelings mainly in that direction, publishing in 1879, Songs of the Heart.

The Juvenile Instructor contained many of her most sympathetic writings for children and the youth of Utah. In the pages of the Woman's Exponent, her work was in a different field. Tullidge's Magazine contained her historical prose contributions.

King wrote of Ferdinand and Isabella, of Columbus, Salvator Rosa and Disraeli, Napoleon and Josephine, Victoria and Elizabeth, the last of whom she somewhat resembled at times in an imperious manner, though her usual mode was one of sympathy, and her nature, one capable of enduring attachment, and unfaltering love. The women of Scripture was also a theme of hers for thought; she published a volume on this topic. In the line of poetry, she considered the "Epic" of the Gospel as her crowning work.

Personal life
She married Thomas Owen King Sr. (1800–1874) in 1824, and they came to Utah in 1853 with Claudius V. Spencer Company. Of their ten children, only four survived into adulthood: Georgina (b. 1830), Louisa (b. 1833), Bertha Mary, Thomas Owen, Jr. (b. 1840).

As her husband was not a member of the LDS Church which held that she could only secure salvation through sealing with a "righteous man", this occurred in 1872 with Brigham Young. Two years later, after the death of Thomas, whom King had continued to live with, Young sent a gift to King of flour, cornmeal, flour, sago and sugar. She had been pleased to sit beside and dance with Young in 1856, but the sealing was an intention for a life together after death.

She died in Salt Lake City on 25 September 1886.

Selected works
 Essay on young women's manners, c. 1835
 Sabbath musings, ca. 1837
 Proceedings in mass meeting of the ladies of Salt Lake City : to protest against the passage of Cullom's Bill, January 14, 1870., 1870, with Bathsheba W Bigler Smith; Eliza R Snow; Harriet Cook Young; Phoebe Woodruff
 The women of the scriptures, 1878
 Songs of the Heart, 1879
 Hannah T. King brief memoir of the early Mormon life of ... : Salt Lake City : ms. S, 1880. 
 Letter to a friend, 1881
 An epic poem : a synopsis of the rise of the Church of Jesus Christ of Latter-Day Saints, from the birth of the Prophet Joseph Smith to the arrival on the spot which the prophet Brigham Young pronounced to be the site of the future Salt Lake City 
 The journals of Hannah Tapfield King

See also

 List of Brigham Young's wives

References

Attribution

Bibliography

External links
 

1808 births
1886 deaths
19th-century English poets
19th-century English women writers
19th-century American poets
19th-century American women writers
People from Sawston
Converts to Mormonism from Anglicanism
Latter Day Saints from Utah
English Latter Day Saint writers
American women poets
Mormon pioneers
English letter writers
Women letter writers
Wives of Brigham Young